The 2012 TIM Supercoppa Italiana Final was the 25th edition of the Supercoppa, an annual football match contested by the winners of the previous season's Serie A and Coppa Italia competitions. It was the third instance in four years that the match took place in China, where it has an increasing fanbase in Italian football

Juventus qualified to take part by winning the 2011–12 Serie A title, while Napoli qualified by winning the 2012 Coppa Italia Final.

Juventus won the game 4–2 after extra time.

Details

References 

Supercoppa Italiana
Supercoppa 2012
Supercoppa 2012
Supercoppa
2
2012